The FOW Tag Team Championship was a professional wrestling tag team title in American independent promotion Future of Wrestling. The title was created when The Masked Assassins (Bobby and Rusty Brooks) won the titles in Miami, Florida on May 20, 1998. It was defended throughout southern Florida, most often in Davie, Oakland Park, Pembroke Pines and occasionally in Ft. Lauderdale and Miami, Florida. There have been a total of 33 recognized individual champions and 16 recognized teams, who have had a combined 24 official reigns.

Title History

.

References

External links
FOW Official Title History
 FOW Tag Team Championship
Tag team wrestling championships